God Bless America is the second compilation album from American recording artist LeAnn Rimes. The album was released on October 16, 2001. The album comprises patriotic and inspirational songs that were originally recorded on her You Light Up My Life: Inspirational Songs album (tracks one, two, eight and ten), as well as songs from her commercial album, All That (tracks five, seven and nine), under the independent label, Nor Va Jak, although "Why Can't We" and "Middle Man" are both re-recordings. "Put a Little Holiday in Your Heart" was originally released as a bonus single, with the song "Unchained Melody", alongside Blue at Target during the 1996 Christmas season. The only two new songs that were released on the album were "The Lord's Prayer" and "The Sands of Time". The album was released as a patriotic tribute to the events of September 11, 2001, with the liner stating "These classic recordings were made while America was first discovering LeAnn Rimes."

Track listing

Personnel
Credits for God Bless America were adapted from liner notes. Additional credits adapted from You Light Up My Life: Inspirational Songs liner notes.
Bob Campbell-Smith – additional recording, mixing
Bob Gentry – bass guitar
Curtis Randall – background vocals, bass guitar
Dan Wojciechowski – drums
Daniel Kresco – assistant mixing
Dennis Willson – background vocals
Gary Leach – assistant mixing, background vocals
Glenn Meadows – master
Greg Hunt – recording, mixing
Greg Morrow – drums
Jeff Watkins – assistant recording
Jerry Matheny – electric guitar
Jimmy Kelly – keyboards
John Willis – electric guitar

Johnny Mulhair – producer
Kelly Glenn – keyboards
LeAnn Rimes – lead vocals
Lesley Albert – production coordinator
Mary Ann Kennedy – background vocals
Michael Black – background vocals
Michael Rhodes – bass guitar 
Michael Spriggs – acoustic guitar
Mike Curb – producer
Mike McClain – recording, mixing
Milo Deering – acoustic guitar, fiddle, steel guitar
Pam Rose – background vocals
Paul Franklin – steel guitar
Roger Wojahn – producer
Steve Nathan – keyboards
Wilbur C. Rimes – producer

Charts

Weekly charts

References

2001 compilation albums
Curb Records compilation albums
LeAnn Rimes albums
Albums produced by Mike Curb